The Foshan Open is a golf tournament on the Challenge Tour. It was played for the first time in October 2013 at the Foshan Golf Club in Foshan, China. It is co-sanctioned by the China Golf Association. Since 2017, it has been part of the China Tour.

Nacho Elvira of Spain won the inaugural event.

Winners

Notes

References

External links
Coverage on the Challenge Tour's official site

Former Challenge Tour events
Golf tournaments in China
Recurring sporting events established in 2013